Ranchitos del Norte is a census-designated place (CDP) in Starr County, Texas, United States. It is a new CDP for the 2010 census with a population of 112. Parts of this new CDP were formed from the former Los Villareales CDP.

Geography
Ranchitos del Norte is located at  (26.400351, -98.871492).

Education
It is in the Rio Grande City Grulla Independent School District (formerly Rio Grande City Consolidated Independent School District)

References

Census-designated places in Starr County, Texas
Census-designated places in Texas